This is a list of films produced or distributed by Universal Pictures in 2020–2029, founded in 1912 as the Universal Film Manufacturing Company. It is the main motion picture production and distribution arm of Universal Studios, a subsidiary of the NBCUniversal division of Comcast.

All films listed are theatrical releases unless specified. Films with a § signify a simultaneous release to theatres and on Peacock. Films with a ‡ signify a release exclusively to Peacock. Films with a * signify a release exclusively to a third party streaming service in North America.

Released

Upcoming

Undated films

See also
 List of Focus Features films
 List of DreamWorks Animation productions
 List of Illumination productions
 List of Universal Pictures theatrical animated feature films
 Universal Pictures
 :Category:Lists of films by studio

Notes
Release notes

Studio/production notes

References

External links

 Universal Pictures

Universal
Lists of Universal Pictures films